Clarence P. LeMire (1886 – October 4, 1961) was a judge of the United States Tax Court from 1946 to 1956.

Born in Martinsville, Missouri, LeMire attended the public schools and received an LL.B. from the University of Missouri School of Law in 1912, also serving as captain of the school football team that year. As a result of the latter activity, he gained the enduring nickname, "Cap". He practiced law in Fulton, Missouri from 1913 to 1917, also coaching football at Westminster College during this time, and serving as an assistant attorney general of Missouri from 1917 to 1920. He moved to Kansas City, Missouri, in 1921, practicing law there until 46, also serving as a member of the Missouri State Legislature from 1927 to 1928.

In 1946, President Harry S. Truman appointed LeMire to a seat on the United States Tax Court, for which LeMire took his oath of office on June 17, 1946 for a term expiring June 2, 1958. Following his retirement from the court at the end of this term, LeMire moved to Bethany, Missouri.

LeMire married Erville Delavan, with whom he had one daughter. LeMire died at Noll Memorial Hospital at the age of 75, following a year-long period of poor health.

References

1866 births
1961 deaths
Judges of the United States Tax Court
Members of the Missouri House of Representatives
Missouri Tigers football players
United States Article I federal judges appointed by Harry S. Truman
University of Missouri School of Law alumni
Westminster Blue Jays football coaches
People from Harrison County, Missouri
Coaches of American football from Missouri
Players of American football from Missouri
Lawyers from Kansas City, Missouri